The Ultimate Solution is a 1973 alternate history novel by journalist and former Playboy interviewer Eric Norden (pen name for Eric Pelletier), set in a world where the Axis forces won World War II and partitioned the world between them. The novel is noted for its particularly grim tone. Norden later wrote the 1977 Adolf Hitler-related science fiction novella The Primal Solution.

Plot
A New York policeman is charged with finding a Jew who is reported to have suddenly appeared in the city decades after all Jews are thought to have been exterminated. There is a reference to a kind of second Wannsee Conference, held at Buckingham Palace in German-occupied London after the extermination of European Jews had been completed, setting up the extension of the Final Solution to the rest of the world; the last few hundred Jews are mentioned as having been discovered and killed by relentless Einsatzgruppen hunters in 1964, having hidden at the ruins of Angkor Wat in Cambodia. There is a Cold War between the former Axis Powers allies, Germany and Japan, both of whom have nuclear weapons and are engaged in an arms race akin to that between the United States and Soviet Union in our own timeline.

Slavs and blacks are raised at "laboratories" and "farms" where their vocal cords are cut at birth and having the legal status not of slaves but of "domestic animals"; naked black gladiators fight to the death at the Madison Square Garden (the Roman "thumbs up" or "down" are modernized into green and red buttons, with a computer making the tally and automatically electrocuting the losing gladiator); children being encouraged by TV programs to torture and kill animals; policemen routinely carrying mobile torture kits for "on the spot interrogations" and having the power of extrajudicial execution against "Enemies of the Reich"; body parts of murdered Jews on sale at souvenir shops, with "collectors" trying to have "a complete collection" of samples from all extermination camps; Christianity (and presumably other religions as well) suppressed in favor of Odinist temples; pedophilia being legal with parents selling their children to sex brothels; and naked Slavic women being crucified in eroticized torture shows, among other horrors.  Homosexuality is legal and considered a state ideal (in sharp contrast with the real-life homophobic policies of Germany).

Former extermination camps are open to the public as "national shrines" – not to commemorate the victims, as in our world, but to glorify the murderers and present them as heroes. What we know as the inoffensive town of Croton-on-Hudson is in this world a North American Auschwitz where the Jews of New York and the East Coast died (another camp is mentioned in the Rocky Mountains, for the West Coast). At the entrance to the town, an Elks Club sign proclaims proudly: "Welcome to Croton-on-Hudson, home of the Final Solution! Here perished four million enemies of the Reich." German doctrine in this world merges with the "American way": a neighboring town whose inhabitants gave refuge to escaping Jews was totally destroyed and its inhabitants killed (like at Lidice in Czechoslovakia); its site was then covered with asphalt and made into a huge parking lot, and later an enormous shopping center was erected on the spot.

"Respectable" society is murderous, but when the protagonist starts digging deeper into the underworld, he discovers, hidden but still there, (what we would call) decent or even heroic people: first, old men still playing chess at the tables in Washington Square; a former Roman Catholic priest who had once broken under Gestapo interrogation and who dreams of a second chance to die as a martyr (the detective protagonist grants him his wish); a member of the underground, known as "Patties" (from George S. Patton, who together with Douglas MacArthur was executed in the "St. Louis Trials") still carrying on a desperate anti-German fight against all odds; finally the hunted Jew himself (who turns out to be from our own world, having fallen into this world by the worst of bad fortune). The protagonist finally kills him—not out of anti-Semitism which he does not really feel (he was born when Jews had already become a literally dead issue) but in a sort of "kindness" since sending him on to Berlin would have only exposed him to some torture before being killed.

The "Cold War" between the Germans and the Japanese seems ready to turn into World War III.  In the power struggle over the legacy of the completely senile Hitler, a putsch overturns the (relatively) moderate faction of Albert Speer, known as "Axists" because they want to maintain the Axis agreements with Japan.  Power is then seized by Reinhard Heydrich and the most fanatical "Contraxists", who are determined to destroy "the degenerate Yellow Race" even at the price of an all-out nuclear war in which Germany itself would be annihilated; this war is apparently incipient by the end of the text as the narrator mentions the NYPD coordinating an evacuation to the Catskills. Token and ineffectual resistance is all killed off, with the entire world about to end.

Criticism
Norden's book, along with others exploring an alternate history where Germany won World War II, has been cited as a work that "fulfilled an important moral function by underscoring the barbarism of Nazism and clearly reinforcing the prevailing view that a Nazi-ruled world would have been an utterly horrific place."

Gavriel David Rosenfeld, in his book The World Hitler Never Made (2005), suggests that Norden might have been inspired to write his novel by a ten-day-long interview he conducted with Albert Speer, which was published in the June 1971 edition of Playboy. During the interview, Speer commented to Norden, "If the Nazis had won, [people] ... would be living in a nightmare". Rosenfeld sees Norden's novel as a morally informed critique of the 1970s "Hitler Wave" of renewed interest in Nazism which followed the publication of Speer's Inside the Third Reich.

The book is criticized as being too "farfetched", as many subjects in the book contradict real-life Nazism and some find it hard to believe that America could be occupied so easily. In the view of some critics, Norden – a radical opponent of the Vietnam War and other aspects of official US policies – might have meant to present to fellow Americans their reflection in "a very dark mirror" rather than portray a realistic alternate scenario of how World War II might have ended.

In support of the latter view can be cited such features as that except for one German appearing briefly in the first chapter, all Nazis in the book are Americans, including the members of the SS and Gestapo, the concentration camp guards and commanders etc. Specifically, the commander of the extermination camp where the New York Jews were killed is presented as a kind of "All-American Boy", universally regarded as a hero, and who did it "not for hatred of Jews, but because it was a job which needed to be done". Further, these Nazis use typical colloquial American expressions while on their Nazi business; members of the New York Police Department use the term "The Feds" when referring to the Gestapo; and they are proud of the Reich's space program and of having landed the first man on the Moon.

See also

Hypothetical Axis victory in World War II, which includes an extensive list of other Wikipedia articles regarding works of Nazi Germany/Axis/World War II alternate history.

References

External Links

 Review by Bill Crider at Bill Crider's Pop Culture Magazine (September 28, 2007)
 Review by Joe Kenney at Glorious Trash (July 1, 2013)
 Review by ColierXII at Fuldapocalypse Fiction (September 19, 2020)

1973 American novels
Dystopian novels
1973 science fiction novels
American science fiction novels
Alternate Nazi Germany novels
Police procedurals